St. Bernard Church and Cemetery is a historic Roman Catholic church and cemetery near Camden, Lewis County, West Virginia.  It was built in 1909, and is a rectangular gable-roofed, one-story frame structure in the Gothic Revival style.  It features a two-story entrance bell tower.  The property includes the church cemetery; it includes the grave of Father Thomas Aquinas Quirk (1845-1937). Most of the settlers in the region, including the congregants of the church, were of Irish descent.

It was listed on the National Register of Historic Places in 1985.

References

Buildings and structures in Lewis County, West Virginia
Cemeteries on the National Register of Historic Places in West Virginia
Irish-American culture in West Virginia
Roman Catholic cemeteries in the United States
Carpenter Gothic church buildings in West Virginia
National Register of Historic Places in Lewis County, West Virginia
Churches on the National Register of Historic Places in West Virginia
Roman Catholic churches completed in 1909
1909 establishments in West Virginia
20th-century Roman Catholic church buildings in the United States